Dmitrii Sergeevich Lankin (born 17 April 1997) is a Russian artistic gymnast. He is the 2017 European floor silver medalist.

Competitive History

Career 
Lankin has competed at the Russian National Championships since 2014 and won team bronze in 2016 and team gold in 2017. He competed internationally at the 2016 World Cup in Varna, Bulgaria where he won a bronze medal in parallel bars.

In 2017, Lankin competed at the 2017 European Championships and won a silver medal in floor behind Romania's Marian Drăgulescu.  Notably, he is the one of a handful of active gymnasts who competes the H-difficulty Liukin or triple back tucked somersault, along with teammate Nikita Nagornyy.

References

External links
 
 Dmitrii Lankin Profile 
 Gymnastics Results

Russian male artistic gymnasts
Sportspeople from Rostov-on-Don
1997 births
Living people
Gymnasts at the 2019 European Games
European Games medalists in gymnastics
European Games silver medalists for Russia
21st-century Russian people